Emmy Putzinger (8 February 1921 – 2001) was an Austrian figure skater who competed in ladies' singles.  She finished seventh at the 1936 Winter Olympic Games and won the bronze medal at the European Figure Skating Championships in 1937 and 1938.

Results

References

1921 births
2001 deaths
Austrian female single skaters
Olympic figure skaters of Austria
Figure skaters at the 1936 Winter Olympics
Place of birth missing
European Figure Skating Championships medalists
20th-century Austrian women